Pedro Lucas Schwaizer (born 5 September 1998) is a Brazilian professional footballer who plays for Portuguese club Mafra as a forward.

Club career
Born in Vale Real, Pedro Lucas joined the youth academy of Internacional in 2008. In 2015, he captained the under-17 side and scored 25 goals in 42 matches.

Ahead of the 2019 season, Pedro Lucas was promoted to the senior team. On 22 January, he made his professional debut, playing the whole ninety minutes of a 1–0 win against São Luiz, in Campeonato Gaúcho.

On 20 July 2021, he moved to Portugal and signed with Mafra.

Career statistics

Personal life
Pedro Lucas' younger sister Maria Luiza is a footballer and plays for the youth team of Santos. Their father André represented Grêmio at the junior level.

References

External links
Internacional profile 

1998 births
Sportspeople from Rio Grande do Sul
Living people
Association football forwards
Brazilian footballers
Sport Club Internacional players
Figueirense FC players
Centro Sportivo Alagoano players
Mirassol Futebol Clube players
C.D. Mafra players
Campeonato Brasileiro Série A players
Campeonato Brasileiro Série B players
Liga Portugal 2 players
Brazilian expatriate footballers
Expatriate footballers in Portugal
Brazilian expatriate sportspeople in Portugal